Prem Krishen (born 5 July 1953) is an Indian actor, turned TV and film producer and the owner of Cinevistaas Limited, a film and television production company established in 1993, known for TV series such as Kathasagar, Gul Gulshan Gulfaam, Junoon, Dill Mill Gayye and Bepannaah.

Early life and education
He is the son of actor Prem Nath and mother Bina Rai. He also has a younger brother, Kailash. His father's sister Krishna married actor-director Raj Kapoor.

Prem Krishen attended Hill Grange High School on Peddar Road, Mumbai.

Career

He followed in his parents' footsteps briefly by starring in the big hit Dulhan Wohi Jo Piya Man Bhaye (1977) which revived the Rajshri banner, and in some television serials, but soon became producer.

Filmography

Actor

Producer
 Film

 Television

References

External links
 

Male actors from Mumbai
Male actors in Hindi cinema
Film producers from Mumbai
Indian television producers
Living people
20th-century Indian male actors
1953 births
Hill Grange High School alumni